The Bialystoker Synagogue at 7–11 Bialystoker Place, also known as Willett Street, between Grand and Broome Streets in the Lower East Side neighborhood of Manhattan, New York City is an Orthodox Jewish synagogue.  The building was constructed in 1826 as the Willett Street Methodist Episcopal Church; the synagogue purchased the building in 1905.

The synagogue was designated a New York City Landmark in 1966. It is one of only four early-19th century fieldstone religious buildings surviving from the late Federal period in Lower Manhattan, and is the oldest building used as a synagogue in New York City.

Congregation 

The Bialystoker Synagogue was first organized in 1865 on Manhattan's Lower East Side as the Chevra Anshei Chesed of Bialystok, founded by a group of Jews who came from the town of Białystok, at that time located in the Russian Empire, but now in Poland. The congregation was begun in a building on Hester Street, it later moved to Orchard Street, and ultimately to its present location 7–11 Bialystoker Place on the Lower East Side.

In order to accommodate the influx of new immigrants from that area of Poland, in 1905 the congregation merged with congregation Adas Yeshurun, also from Bialystok, and formed the Beit Ha-Knesset Anshei Bialystok (The Bialystoker Synagogue). The newly formed congregation then purchased (and moved into) the Willett Street Methodist Episcopal Church at 7 Willet Street, which was later renamed Bialystoker Place. During the Great Depression a decision was made to beautify the main sanctuary, to provide a sense of hope and inspiration to the community.

The community today is the biggest synagogue in the Lower East Side with several daily minyanim. Rabbi Zvi Romm serves as the Rabbi.

Architecture 
The fieldstone Methodist Episcopal Church building was built in 1826 with a simple pedimented roof and round arched windows.  The building is made of Manhattan schist from a quarry on nearby Pitt Street. The exterior is marked by three windows over three doors framed with round arches, a low flight of brownstone steps, a low pitched pediment roof with a lunette window and a wooden cornice.

The elaborate Torah Ark is believed to have been carved in Bialystok and shipped to New York.

As the synagogue is home to an Orthodox Jewish congregation, a balcony section was constructed to accommodate female congregants.  In the corner of the women's gallery a small hidden door in the wall that leads to a ladder going up to an attic, lit by two windows was constructed.  When it was first opened, the building was a rest stop for the Underground Railroad movement; runaway slaves found sanctuary in this attic.

When the air conditioning was updated in the 1990s, an issue arose in the construction of rooftop units because of the building's historical landmark status.  Because of these concerns, the cooling units were installed on the side of the building.

Present activity 
In 1988, the congregation restored the interior to its original splendor, and the former Hebrew school building that is attached, but had become dilapidated, was renovated and reopened as The Daniel Potkorony Building.  The magnificent stained glass windows were recently completely recreated and renewed.

See also 
 Kossar's Bialystoker Kuchen Bakery
 Bugsy Siegel Memorial
 List of New York City Landmarks
 National Register of Historic Places listings in New York County, New York

References
Notes

External links 

 Official website of the Bialystoker Synagogue of Manhattan
 Lower East Side Tenement Museum
 NYC Architecture

Lower East Side
History of immigration to the United States
Synagogues in Manhattan
New York City Designated Landmarks in Manhattan
Religious organizations established in 1865
Churches completed in 1826
Polish-Jewish culture in New York City
Properties of religious function on the National Register of Historic Places in Manhattan
Orthodox synagogues in New York City
Federal synagogues
Federal architecture in New York City
Methodist churches in New York City
Churches in Manhattan
1865 establishments in New York (state)
Synagogues on the National Register of Historic Places in New York City
Methodist Episcopal churches in the United States
Underground Railroad locations